Sarah's Choice is a 2009 American direct-to-video Christian drama film directed by Chad Kapper. The film was the first lead film role for contemporary Christian singer-songwriter Rebecca St. James as the title character, along with Andrea Logan White and Dick Van Patten. Christian comedian Brad Stine also appears in the film, along with Charlene Tilton and Staci Keanan. It was released to DVD on November 1, 2009, and was aired on February 27, 2010, on the Trinity Broadcasting Network.

Plot 
Sarah Collins's (Rebecca St. James) co-worker gets pregnant which means Sarah could get a promotion. Meanwhile, her boyfriend Matt (Julian Bailey) is pulling pranks. Sarah then finds out she is pregnant. At the doctor's office, a lady gives her a card and tells her the Lord will give her three visions. Megan (Andrea Logan White) reveals her story about her abortion. Sarah is considering an abortion. Before she makes her final decision, her visions cause her to think about her future.

Cast 

 Rebecca St. James as Sarah Collins
 Andrea Logan White as Megan
 Dick Van Patten as Pastor Smith
 Brad Stine as Clay
 Staci Keanan as Denise
 Robert Miano as Henry
 Charlene Tilton as Michelle Biden
 Ethan Cooper Roy as Jack
 Julian Bailey as Matt Evans
 Sidney Mason Gunn as Jill
 Sean McGowan as Chad
 Matthew Bacis as Michael
 Linda Bisesti as Agnes Collins
 Marc Davies as Bob
 Judy Lewis as Older Sarah
 Carey Scott as Justin
 Sean Sedgwick as Thad
 Libby Smallbone as Daisy
 Yvette Tucker as Jennifer

Production 
Principal filming was completed in Ohio at the end of February 2009. When speaking of her role in the film, Rebecca St. James said, "Obviously, everyone wants a redemptive story, but the truth is that 43 percent of childbearing-age women today have abortions; it's much higher than what most people think." St. James wrote the song, "Little One", for the film.

Release 
Sarah's Choice was released to DVD on November 1, 2009, and DVD release was followed by a theatrical premiere at Warner Brothers Studios in Hollywood. The DVD contains bonus features "The Making Of", "Trailers", and "Commentary", and is available from EMI CMG Distribution. It was shown at the Projecting Hope Film Festival at Waterworks Cinemas near Fox Chapel, Pennsylvania.

Reception 
Megan Basham of World magazine said, "Newcomer Rebecca St. James turns in a subtle and affecting performance as Sarah... Unfortunately that promising beginning is squandered when the story slides into the trap of over-simplifying and oversentimentalizing that characterizes so many Christian films." Jesusfreakhideout gave the film four out of five stars and mentioned it was one of the best Christian films to date. CBN noted the film's storyline of lead character Sarah Collins by stating the film "portrays all the believable influences for abortion through her co-workers, pro-abortion medical clinic, and her personal motives to stay on the career track". They noted the film's "pro-life message", and that the filmmakers approached the topic without use of graphic representations, "making it suitable for family viewing, as well as, for church groups". The noted that Rebecca St James wrote and sang the song "Little One", which was used as background music at the end of the film, and praised St. James' for "infusing her character with the passion she portrays in music".

Book
A novel based on the film was released on May 27, 2014, and authored by Rebecca St. James and Nancy Rue.

References

External links 
 
 

2009 films
2009 drama films
2000s pregnancy films
Films about evangelicalism
Films about abortion
Pure Flix Entertainment films
Films produced by Russell Wolfe
Films produced by David A. R. White
Films shot in Ohio
2000s English-language films